Famagusta District is one of the six districts of Cyprus. Its main town is the island's most important port, Famagusta.

History 
Most of the district has been under Turkish control since the 1974 invasion. Since 1998, the northeastern section, including the Karpaz Peninsula, has been administered separately as the İskele District, a division not recognized by the Republic of Cyprus and the UN.

A district administration in "exile" exists on the Republic of Cyprus-controlled part of the island. This part of the district has a population of 46,900 inhabitants (2015).

Cape Greco ("Greek cape"), is a headland in the southeastern part of the district. It is at the southern end of Famagusta Bay. It is visited by tourists for its natural environment, and is a protected coastal nature park. From the high points on the cliff that rests at the cape one can view out to sea. According to local legend, it is also the home of the Ayia Napa sea monster.

The area includes the fertile area known as the 'red villages' (Kokkinochoria, Κοκκινοχώρια), named after the distinct red color of the soil.

Settlements
According to Statistical Codes of Municipalities, Communities and Quarters of Cyprus per the Statistical Service of Cyprus (2015), Famagusta District has 8 municipalities and 90 communities. Municipalities are written with bold.

 Acheritou
 Achna
 Afania
 Agia Trias
 Agios Andronikos (Topçuköy)
 Agios Andronikos
 Agios Chariton
 Agios Efstathios
 Agios Georgios
 Agios Iakovos
 Agios Ilias
 Agios Nikolaos
 Agios Sergios
 Agios Symeon
 Agios Theodoros
 Akanthou
 Aloda
 Angastina
 Ardana
 Arnadi
 Artemi
 Asha
 Avgolida
 Avgorou
 Ayia Napa
 Bogazi
 Davlos
 Deryneia
 Enkomi
 Eptakomi
 Famagusta
 Flamoudi
 Frenaros
 Gaidouras
 Galateia
 Galinoporni
 Gastria
 Genagra
 Gerani
 Gialousa
 Goufes
 Gypsou
 Kalopsida
 Knodara
 Koilanemos
 Koma tou Gialou
 Komi Kebir
 Kontea
 Kornokipos
 Koroveia
 Kouklia
 Krideia
 Lapathos
 Lefkoniko
 Leonarisso
 Limnia
 Liopetri
 Livadia
 Lysi
 Lythrangomi
 Makrasyka
 Mandres
 Maratha
 Marathovounos
 Melanagra
 Melounta
 Milia
 Monarga
 Mousoulita
 Neta
 Ovgoros
 Paralimni
 Patriki
 Peristerona
 Perivolia
 Pigi
 Platani
 Platanissos
 Prastio
 Psyllatos
 Pyrga
 Rizokarpaso
 Santalaris
 Sinta
 Sotira
 Spathariko
 Strongylos
 Stylloi
 Sygkrasi
 Tavros
 Trikomo
 Trypimeni
 Tziaos
 Vasili
 Vathylakas
 Vatili
 Vitsada
 Vokolida

References

External links 

Famagusta Gazette Newspaper

 
Districts of Cyprus